Oh! The Grandeur is Andrew Bird's second album with the Bowl of Fire.  The first track, "Candy Shop", was recorded as a demo track for the then-upcoming Tim Robbins film, Cradle Will Rock (though the song did not appear in the film). Another track of note on this album is "Tea & Thorazine," which was inspired by Bird's autistic brother's experience with mental institutions.  The song mentions a "Dr. B" and Bird identifies him in the album liner notes as Bruno Bettelheim, an early autism researcher.

The US release uses HDCD encoding, but the package is not labeled as HDCD.

Track listing

Other appearances

 A live version of "Tea & Thorazine" appears on Fingerlings 2 as "T'n't".
 "The Confession" was later reworked into the song "The Privateers" on the album Noble Beast.

References

External links
Album information page on artist's official web site (select cover)

Andrew Bird albums
1999 albums
Rykodisc albums